Efficiency expert may refer to:

Ergonomics expert 
Business efficiency expert; see also, Layoffs
The Efficiency Expert, a 1921 novel by Edgar Rice Burroughs

See also
Spotswood (film), US title The Efficiency Expert, Australian comedy film released in 1992